is a Japanese film, TV and stage actress. She has starred in several Japanese movies that are today considered classics (especially in the Zatoichi saga, and the Daimajin trilogy).

Takada also worked as a singer, and the duet she recorded with Mitsuo Kaji, "Waga Ai wo Hoshi ni Inorite," became a huge hit. Now she focuses on stage performances and TV. She lives in Numazu.

Filmography
Takada'a filmography as an actress includes the following.

References

External links
  Official profile 

1947 births
Living people
Japanese film actresses
Japanese television actresses
Actresses from Kyoto
Japanese women singers